David Cleghorn Hogg JP (1840 – 22 August 1914) was a Protestant businessman and politician, originally from  Scotland, but established resident in Victoria Park, Derry, County Londonderry.

Career
David Hogg and his partner, Charles Mitchell, built a five-storey shirt factory in Great James Street in 1898. since converted into apartments. He became a magistrate. On 7 January 1911, he was appointed Lord Lieutenant of County Londonderry. He remained Lord Lieutenant until his death.

Political career
James Hamilton, Marquis of Hamilton succeeded to the Dukedom of Abercorn, resulting in the 1913 Londonderry City by-election. Hogg was nominated as a Liberal and received the support of the Catholic clergy, despite his religion.  

He defeated the Unionist candidate Hercules Arthur Pakenham by 57 votes. According to Hogg's sole speech in the House of Commons, his election address declared that he was a Liberal in favour of Home Rule for Ireland, but he had not canvassed for votes. His victory at Londonderry meant that there were a majority of Ulster MPs (17 to 16) who supported the Liberal government.

Election results

Death
Hogg died on 22 August 1914, leading to the 1914 Londonderry City by-election. He was the last Liberal MP elected in Ireland in a contested election; his successor Sir James Brown Dougherty was the last such elected, but he ran unopposed.

References

External links
 

1840 births
1914 deaths
Irish Liberal Party MPs
Members of the Parliament of the United Kingdom for County Londonderry constituencies (1801–1922)
UK MPs 1910–1918
Lord-Lieutenants of County Londonderry
Politicians from Derry (city)
Date of birth missing
Place of birth missing
Place of death missing